The Jack Sport was a French automobile manufactured from 1925 until 1930.

Built in Paris by one M. Corbeau (also a builder of motorcycles), it was a 410 cc single-cylinder cyclecar.

References
David Burgess Wise, The New Illustrated Encyclopedia of Automobiles.

Cyclecars
Defunct motor vehicle manufacturers of France